The Erawirung (Yirawirung, Jirawirung) people, also known as Yirau, Juju and other names, were an Aboriginal Australian people whose traditional territory was located in what is today the Riverland of South Australia. They consisted of sub-groups or clans, including Jeraruk, Rankbirit and Wilu, and have been referred to as Meru people, which was a larger grouping which could also include the Ngawait and Ngaiawang peoples.

Language

The Erawirung appear to have spoken a dialect of the Yuyu language common to their neighbours. This language group is alternatively called the Meru language group, and is included under this name on the AIATSIS Language Map.

Country
Their western boundary reached from Rufus Creek into the vicinity of the Overland Corner.

Social organisation and economy
The Erawirung were divided into hordes, of which the following are known:
 Jeraruk
 Rankbirit (totem = eaglehawk)
 Wilu

They practiced circumcision alone, but not dental avulsion in initiation rites.

chert mining in two of their localities, at Springcart Gully and at a site south of Renmark formed an important element of the Erawirung economy, and the areas were strongly defended from neighbouring tribes.

History
Early ethnographers often classified the small Erawirung tribe as one of a collective group named the Meru people. The Erawirung had slipped from the memory of the nearby Jarildekald by the time Ronald Murray Berndt interviewed the latter in the late 1930s-early 1940s.

Alternative names
 Eramwirrangu.
 Erawiruck.
 Jeraruk.
 Yerraruck.
 Yirau.
 Pomp-malkie.
 Meru. (meru meaning 'man')
 Juju. (Maraura exonym, ju being their word for 'no').
 Yuyu, You-you.
 Rankbirit.
 Wilu, Willoo.

Notes

Citations

Sources

Aboriginal peoples of South Australia
History of South Australia